The Human Rights Commission (Māori: Te Kāhui Tika Tangata) is the national human rights institution (NHRI) for New Zealand. It operates as an independent Crown entity, and is independent from direction by the Cabinet.

Legislation and functions
The commission was formed in 1977, and currently functions under the mandate of the Human Rights Act 1993. The Office of the Race Relations Conciliator was consolidated with the Human Rights Commission by an amendment to the Human Rights Act in 2001. The commission's primary functions are to "advocate and promote respect for, and an understanding and appreciation of, human rights in New Zealand society, and to encourage the maintenance and development of harmonious relations between individuals and among the diverse groups in New Zealand society".

The commission's functions include providing a dispute resolution service for complaints of unlawful discrimination, and racial or sexual harassment.

Commissioners
Chief Commissioner – Prof Paul Hunt
Race Relations Commissioner – Meng Foon
EEO (Equal Employment Opportunities) Commissioner – Dr Karanina Sumeo
Disability Rights Commissioner – Paula Tesoriero, MNZM

Jeremy Pope served as a Commissioner until his death in August 2012.

Race Relations
The 1993 Act transformed the previous Race Relations Conciliator into a Race Relations Commissioner.  Holders of the position have been:
 Sir Guy Powles (1972–1973)
 Harry Dansey (1975–1979)
 Hiwi Tauroa (1980–1986)
 Wally Hirsh (1986–1989)
 Chris Laidlaw (1989–1992)
 John Clarke (1992–1995)
 Dr Rajen Prasad (1995–2000) 
 Gregory Fortuin (2001–2002)
 Joris de Bres (2002–2013)
 Dame Susan Devoy (2013–2018)
 Meng Foon (2019–present)

International status
The commission is one of some 70 NHRIs accredited by the International Co-ordinating Committee of NHRIs (ICC), a body sponsored by the Office of the United Nations High Commissioner for Human Rights (OHCHR). The commission's "A status" accreditation allows it special access to the United Nations human rights system, including speaking rights at the Human Rights Council and other committees. The commission has presented parallel reports ("shadow reports") to several UN treaty committees examining New Zealand's compliance with international human rights instruments. From 2010 to 2012 the Commission chaired the ICC, and the Asia Pacific Forum of NHRIs, one of four regional sub-groups of NHRIs.

History

Review of human rights
In 2010 the Commission conducted a publicly available review of human rights in New Zealand in order to both identify the areas in which New Zealand does well, and where it could do better to combat persistent social problems. The 'report card' was an update of the Commission's first report in 2004, and led its work for the next five years. The report noted steady improvements in New Zealand's human rights record since 2004, but also "the fragility of some of the gains and areas where there has been deterioration." In the report, the Commission identified thirty priority areas for action on human rights in New Zealand under a number of sections: general; civil and political rights; economic, social and cultural rights; and rights of specific groups.

Inquiry into culture and processes
In February 2018, Justice Minister Andrew Little commissioned an ministerial inquiry into the commission by retired judge Coral Shaw, following media reports of a sexual harassment scandal there. Sunday Star-Times journalist Harrison Christian had earlier reported a young American woman cut short her internship at the commission after she was groped by the organisation's chief financial officer at a work party. Shaw's review found the commission had failed in its handling of sexual harassment claims.

See also
Human rights in New Zealand
Human Rights Commissions
National Statement on Religious Diversity

References

External links

Human rights organisations based in New Zealand
National human rights institutions
Government of New Zealand
Human Rights Commission
New Zealand independent crown entities
1977 establishments in New Zealand
Courts and tribunals established in 1977